Sundarakilladi is a 1998 Indian Malayalam-language drama film directed by Murali Krishnan and written and produced by Fazil. It stars Dileep, Shalini Kumar, Nedumudi Venu, Kuthiravattom Pappu, Nandhu, Reshmi Boban and Ashokan in the lead roles. The story takes place in Swapnabhoomi, a village suffering from water shortage, Premachandran, the son of a renowned well digger arrives to dig a well on their offer. The film did above average business at box office.

Plot
The plot takes place in the fictitious village of Swapnabhoomi, where strange customs and rituals continue to the modern age. Faced with a water shortage, the village-head, sends the Bhuvanappan to inform Premachandran of the situation and to commission him to dig a well at Swapnabhoomi. Although Premachandran is the son of a renowned well digger, he is untrained in the profession and makes a living as a stage artist. Thus he's unsure of following his father's footsteps and tries to send away the group form Swapnabhoomi by quoting an outrageous fee for digging the well.

The villagers readily agree to his terms and contracts him to the task by paying his charges upfront. Then he discovers that other workers who had tried to dig a well there died because of earthquake after digging 45 kol(kol is the length in Kerala, 1 kol=72 cm)(33 m).He tries to escape from the people of Swapnabhoomi, but fails and starts the work as a challenge.

Later, he falls in love with the stepdaughter of the physician Devayaani, who treats him when he meets with an accident while digging the well. But the rule of Swapnabhoomi is that a girl of the village may only court a man who is from Swapnabhoomi itself. One day a man discovers their love and informs the head. The head orders them to stop seeing each other. If Premachandran disobeys, they will kill him and if Devayaani disobeys, then they will send her to a mountain where man eaters live.

The head tells Premachandran that, if the well fills with water, then he can marry Devayaani. Later, Premachandran learns that on the last day of work, rain should not occur. Because of the fear, the head orders the destruction of the well, but Premachandran jumps into the well. When Devayaani learns about this, she breaks the rule and comes to see him. The people take her to the place where they have to do rituals and send her to the mountain. But water fills the well of Swapnabhoomi. Premachandran informs this to everyone and takes her to his home.

Cast

Music

Release
A critic from Times of India wrote "Dileep’s performance is surprisingly good. But a more talented actor could have made this role a memorable one."

References

External links
 

1990s Malayalam-language films
Indian fantasy films
1998 fantasy films
1998 films
Films scored by Ouseppachan